The 1978 United States Senate special election in Alabama was held on November 7, 1978. It was a special election to fill the seat which had been held by Senator Jim Allen, who died on June 1. His widow Maryon was appointed on June 8 by governor George Wallace to fill the vacancy until a special election could be held.

Democratic state senator Donald W. Stewart defeated Allen in the Democratic primary then defeated former Republican Congressman James D. Martin to serve the remaining two years of the term.

Primary election
Primary elections were held on September 5, 1978, with the Democratic runoff held on September 26, 1978.

Democratic primary

Candidates
Maryon Pittman Allen, incumbent United States Senator
Gene Myracle, business owner
Donald W. Stewart, State Senator
Ted Taylor, President of the Alabama Trial Lawyers Association
Dan Wiley, President of the Mobile County Commission

Results

Republican primary

Candidates
Elvin McCary, Republican nominee for Governor in 1974
George W. Nichols, attorney

Results

Withdrew
Nichols withdrew from the race in order that James D. Martin, former U.S. Representative for Alabama's 7th congressional district, who had been nominated to run in the concurrent regular Senate election, could switch races.

General election

Results

Bibliography

See also
  1978 United States Senate elections
  1978 United States Senate election in Alabama
  1978 Alabama gubernatorial election

References 

United States Senate special
Alabama (Special)
1978 special
Alabama 1978
United States Senate 1978
Alabama 1978